Latino Americans make up an increasing share of the United States (U.S.) electorate. A record 29 million Latinos were eligible to vote in the 2018 midterm elections, accounting for 12.8% of all eligible voters, a new high. They made up an estimated 11% of all voters nationwide on Election Day, nearly matching their share of the U.S. eligible voter population (U.S. citizens ages 18 and older).

History
The U.S. Census indicates that the Latino population of the U.S. is the fastest growing minority group in the country. More than 12.8% of eligible voters nationwide are Latino.

20th century
Prior to the 1950's, Hispanic political affiliation swayed back and forth between the two major parties. From the American Civil War to the Great Depression, the majority of American Hispanics, as well as the majority of African-Americans, were Republicans. However, following the Great Depression, more Hispanics began to side with the Democratic party, due to Franklin D. Roosevelt and his New Deal agenda. Many Hispanics were distrustful of Herbert Hoover and the Republican party, who they viewed as responsible for the economic crash.

American Hispanics first began to widely support a Republican candidate, Dwight D. Eisenhower, during the 1952 U.S. presidential election. Hispanic World War II veterans were drawn to support Eisenhower due to his service in the war, as well as the belief that he would be able to end the Korean war. Other non-veteran Hispanic voters were drawn to Eisenhower, due to his promotion of hard work, freedom, prosperity, and religious spirituality. Hispanic conservatives created groups such as "Latinos con Eisenhower" and pinned political buttons on their shirts stating "Me Gusta Ike".

In 1980, Republican Ben Fernandez became the first Hispanic to ever run for President of the United States. Over the next decade, Ronald Reagan viewed Latino social values as closely related to conservative values, as both tended to place an emphasis on religious faith, family, and hard work. Additionally, both groups tended to maintain a strong opposition to abortion and same-sex marriage. Reagan often stated that "Hispanics are conservative. They just don’t know it.”

21st century

In the 2018 midterm elections, three out of four Latino voters supported a Democratic candidate. However, Republicans enjoy strong support among Cuban-American voters, as well as among Latino voters in Florida and Texas. Mexican-Americans, Puerto Ricans, Salvadoran-Americans, Guatemalan-Americans, and Dominican-Americans tend to support the Democratic Party. As the latter groups are far more numerous (Mexican-Americans make up 64% of the Latino population in the United States), the Democratic Party typically receives the majority of the Latino vote. 

Although Latinos as a whole, tend to support Democratic candidates, the Democratic Party has lost ground among their voting population since its high-water mark in 2012. 

In 2006, 69% of Latino voters supported Democratic candidates in congressional races, while 30% supported Republican candidates.

In 2008, 67% of Latinos voted for then-Democratic presidential nominee Barack Obama, while 31% of Latinos voted for then-Republican presidential nominee John McCain. 

During the 2010 midterm elections, 31% of eligible Latino voters turned out to vote. 60% of Latinos supported Democratic candidates, while 38% supported Republican candidates.

A 2012 study by the Center for Immigration Studies projected that in November 2012 Latinos would comprise 17.2% of the total U.S. population, 15% of adults, 11.2% of adult citizens, and 8.9% of voters. By comparison, the report found that in 2012, non-Latino whites are expected to be 73.4% of the national vote and non-Latino blacks are expected to be 12.2%. The report noted that by weight, "eight percentage points of the Latino vote nationally equals slightly less than one percentage point of the non-Latino white vote." The study also compared the 8.9% Latino share of voters to veterans (12% of the electorate), those with family incomes above $100,000 (18%), seniors 65 and older (19%), married persons (60%), and those who live in owner-occupied housing (80%).

In terms of voter turnout, the Center for Immigration Studies projected that 52.7% (±0.6) of eligible Latinos would vote in the 2012 election, an increase from 49.9% in 2008 and a continuation of the past decade's long upward trend. The projected Latino voter participation rate of 52.7% compares to 66.1% for non-Latino whites and 65.2% for non-Latino blacks in 2008.

In 2012, 70% of Latino voters identified with, or leaned toward, the Democratic Party, while 20% of Latino voters identified with, or leaned toward, the Republican Party.

In 2014, Latinos cast 6.8 million ballots out of 25 million eligible voters, for a voter turnout rate of 27%.

During the 2016 presidential election, Republican presidential nominee Donald Trump was supported by 57% of Cuban-American voters in Florida, while Democratic presidential nominee Hillary Clinton received 40% of the vote.

In 2018, 29.1 million Latinos were eligible to vote. 62% of Latino voters identified with, or leaned toward, the Democratic Party, whereas 27% of Latino voters identified with, or leaned toward, the Republican Party. Latino voters who primarily spoke English were more likely to support Republican candidates (33%), compared to voters who only spoke Spanish (15%). In Florida, 66% of Cuban-Americans supported Republican gubernatorial nominee Ron DeSantis, while only 33% supported Democrat gubernatorial nominee Andrew Gillum, a 2 to 1 ratio for Republicans. 

According to a 2019 Gallup Poll, 29% of Latinos identify as conservative, and that same number, 29%, voted for Donald Trump in the 2016 Presidential Election.

A 2021 Wall Street Journal poll found that if the 2022 United States elections were held immediately, 37% of Hispanic voters would back Republican nominees and 37% would back Democratic nominees, an even split. The poll also found that if the 2024 United States presidential election was held between Joe Biden and Donald Trump, 44% of Hispanics would back Biden and 43% would back Trump. These numbers were split more among gender, with 56% of Hispanic men and 30% of Hispanic women preferring Trump to Biden. By comparison, 33% of Hispanic men and 55% of Hispanic women prefer Biden to Trump. This marks a significant decline for Democrats from the 2020 election, where Biden won roughly 63% of Hispanic votes.

Elections

Key issues
In an October 2010 Pew Hispanic Center report, Latinos ranked education, jobs, and health care as their top three issues of concern, while immigration ranked as the fourth most important issue. 

In 2020, the economy, health care, and the COVID-19 pandemic were reported to be the top three most important issues for Latino voters.

Opinion pieces that have appeared in magazines and websites such as FiveThirtyEight and The Atlantic have frequently argued that there is no such thing as a "Latino vote", as Hispanics do not tend to vote in a singular bloc. Factors such as age, sex, religion, ethnicity, and immigration status can all significantly influence voting factors among Hispanics and Latinos.

Abortion
A 2009 Gallup poll found that 57% of Hispanics oppose abortion, more than any other group in the United States. Older Hispanics are more likely to oppose abortion than young Hispanics. Likewise, first-generation Hispanics are more likely to oppose abortion than second-generation Hispanics.

62% of Latinos who have immigrated to the U.S. support greater restrictions on abortion legality.

Economy
In 2022, economic issues remain the primary concern for Hispanic voters. In a Wall Street Journal poll, Hispanic men stated that Republicans possessed better economic policy, by a margin of 17 points, while Hispanic women stated that Democrats had better economic policy, by a 10-point margin.

Gender-neutral terminology
The use of the gender-neutral term "Latinx" is highly unpopular among Hispanic and Latino voters, with over 90% disliking the term. The term has been used by prominent Democrat politicians such as Joe Biden, Elizabeth Warren, and Alexandria Ocasio-Cortez; who have been widely mocked by many Republicans, Hispanics, and Latinos for its use.

A 2021 poll found that 30% of Hispanic voters are less likely to vote for a politician who uses the term "Latinx". 68% of Hispanic voters prefer the term "Hispanic", while 21% of voters prefer the term "Latino". By comparison, only 2% of Hispanic voters embrace the term "Latinx". Furthermore, 40% of American Hispanics state that the term "Latinx" bothers or offends them.

Timeline of events

This is a timeline of significant events in Latino history which have shaped the conservative movement in the United States.

 1860s
 1863 – Romualdo Pacheco elected as California State Treasurer
 Francisco Perea (New Mexico Territory) elected to U.S. Congress (non voting delegate)
 1865 – José Francisco Chaves (New Mexico Territory) elected to U.S. Congress (non voting delegate)

 1870s
 1871 – Romualdo Pacheco elected as Lieutenant Governor of California
 1875 – Romualdo Pacheco appointed as Governor of California
 1877 – Romualdo Pacheco (CA) elected to U.S. Congress and Trinidad Romero (New Mexico Territory) elected to U.S. Congress (non voting delegate)
 1879 – Mariano S. Otero (New Mexico Territory) elected to U.S. Congress (non voting delegate)

 1880s
 1881 – Tranquilino Luna (New Mexico Territory) elected to U.S. Congress (non voting delegate)

 1890s
 1897 – Miguel Antonio Otero elected as Governor of New Mexico Territory
 1899 – Pedro Perea (New Mexico Territory) elected to U.S. Congress (non voting delegate)

 1900s
 1901 – Federico Degetau elected to U.S. Congress (1st Resident commissioner of Puerto Rico)
 1905 – Tulio Larrínaga elected to U.S. Congress (1st Resident commissioner of Puerto Rico)

 1910s
 1911 – Luis Muñoz Rivera elected to U.S. Congress (1st Resident commissioner of Puerto Rico)
 1917 – Félix Córdova Dávila (Resident commissioner of Puerto Rico) and Benigno C. Hernández (NM) elected to U.S. Congress
 1919 – Octaviano Ambrosio Larrazolo elected as Governor of New Mexico

 1920s
 1921 – Néstor Montoya (NM) elected to U.S. Congress
 1928 – Octaviano Ambrosio Larrazolo elected as United States senator from New Mexico

 1960s
 1967 – Ben Fernandez creates the Republican National Hispanic Assembly
 1969 – Luis A. Ferré elected as Governor of the Commonwealth of Puerto Rico
 Jorge Luis Córdova (Resident commissioner of Puerto Rico) and Manuel Lujan, Jr. (NM) elected to U.S. Congress

 1970s
 1971 – President Richard M. Nixon appoints Romana Acosta Bañuelos as Treasurer of the United States
 1973 – President Richard M. Nixon appoints Ben Fernandez as Ambassador to Paraguay
 1977 – Baltasar Corrada del Río elected to U.S. Congress (Resident commissioner of Puerto Rico)
 1979 – Mike Curb elected as lieutenant governor of California

 1980s
 1981 – President Ronald Reagan appoints John Gavin as United States Ambassador to Mexico
 1983 – President Ronald Reagan appoints Katherine D. Ortega as Treasurer of the United States
 Barbara Vucanovich (NV) is elected to U.S. Congress
 Patricia Dillon Cafferata is elected Nevada State Treasurer
 1985 – President Ronald Reagan appoints Linda Chavez as Assistant to the President for Public Liaison
 1987 – Bob Martinez elected as Governor of Florida
 1989 – President George H. W. Bush appoints Manuel Lujan, Jr. as United States Secretary of the Interior
 Ileana Ros–Lehtinen (FL) is elected to U.S. Congress

 1990s
 1990 – President George H. W. Bush appoints Vice Admiral Dr. Antonia Novello as Surgeon General of the United States
 1991 – President George H. W. Bush appoints Bob Martínez as Director of the National Drug Control Policy
 1993 – Henry Bonilla (TX) and Lincoln Díaz–Balart (FL) elected to U.S. Congress
 1995 – Tony Garza appointed Texas Secretary of State
 1997 – John E. Sununu (NH) is elected to U.S. Congress
 Alberto Gonzales appointed Texas Secretary of State
 1999 – Alberto Gonzales elected as Associate justice of the Texas Supreme Court

 2000s
 2000 – Matthew G. Martinez (CA) Democratic Congressman joins GOP
 2001 – President George W. Bush appoints the following:
 Hector Barreto as Administrator of the Small Business Administration
 Rosario Marin as Treasurer of the United States
 Mel Martínez as United States Secretary of Housing and Urban Development
 Alberto Gonzales as White House Counsel
 Elsa Murano as Under Secretary of Agriculture for Food Safety
 Leslie Sanchez as executive director, White House Initiative on Educational Excellence for Hispanic Americans
 Cari M. Dominguez as chair of the Equal Employment Opportunity Commission
 Major General William A. Navas, Jr. as Assistant Secretary of the Navy (Manpower and Reserve Affairs)
 Michael Montelongo as Assistant Secretary of the Air Force (Financial Management & Comptroller)
 Alberto J. Mora as General Counsel of the Navy
 Michael L. Dominguez as Assistant Secretary of the Air Force (Manpower & Reserve Affairs)
 Dionel M. Aviles as Assistant Secretary of the Navy (Financial Management and Comptroller)
 Israel Hernandez as Assistant Secretary of Commerce for International Trade and Promotion
 Douglas Domenech as Deputy Director of the Office of External and Intergovernmental Affairs in the United States Department of the Interior
 Colonel Dr. Jacob Lozada as Assistant Secretary of Veterans Affairs
 Ruben Barrales as Director of Intergovermental Affairs in the White House
 Leslie Sanchez as Director of the White House Initiative on Educational Excellence for Hispanic Americans
 Jaime Molera is appointed Arizona Superintendent of Public Instruction
 2002 – President George W. Bush appoints the following:
Tony Garza as United States Ambassador to Mexico
Michael J. Garcia as commissioner of the Immigration and Naturalization Service
 2003 – President George W. Bush appoints the following:
Roger Noriega as Assistant Secretary of State for Western Hemisphere Affairs
Rear Admiral Dr. Cristina V. Beato as United States Assistant Secretary for Health
Colonel Dr. Jacob Lozada as Human Resource Agencys Special Advisor to the Director of OPM for Diversity Strategy
Alex Acosta as Assistant Attorney General for Civil Rights
Mario Díaz–Balart (FL) elected to U.S. Congress
Texas Attorney General Greg Abbott appoints Ted Cruz as Solicitor General of Texas
Brian Sandoval elected as Attorney General of Nevada
John E. Sununu elected as United States senator from New Hampshire
 2004 – President George W. Bush appoints Dionel M. Aviles as Under Secretary of the Navy
 2005 – President George W. Bush appoints the following:
Alberto Gonzales as United States Attorney General
Carlos Gutierrez as United States Secretary of Commerce
Anna Escobedo Cabral as Treasurer of the United States
Michael L. Dominguez as acting United States Secretary of the Air Force
Emilio T. Gonzalez as Director of United States Citizenship and Immigration Services (USCIS)
Israel Hernandez as Assistant Secretary of Commerce for International Trade and Promotion and Director–General of the United States Commercial Service
Alfonso Martinez–Fonts Jr. as Assistant Secretary for the Private Sector Office at the United States Department of Homeland Security
Juan Zarate as Deputy Assistant to the President and Deputy National Security Advisor for Combating Terrorism
Raymond P. Martinez as Deputy Chief of Protocol of the United States
Eduardo Aguirre as United States Ambassador to Spain
 Mel Martínez elected as United States senator from Florida
 Luis Fortuño elected to U.S. Congress (Resident commissioner of Puerto Rico)
 2006 – President George W. Bush appoints the following:
Hugo Teufel III as Chief Privacy Officer, Department of Homeland Security
Lisette M. Mondello as Assistant Secretary of Public and Intergovernmental Affairs in the Department of Veterans Affairs
Nancy Montanez Johner as Under Secretary of Agriculture for Food, Nutrition, and Consumer Services
Frank Jimenez as General Counsel of the Navy
 2007 – President George W. Bush appoints Christopher A. Padilla as Under Secretary for International Trade
 2008 – President George W. Bush appoints Admiral Joxel García as United States Assistant Secretary for Health
Esperanza Andrade appointed Texas Secretary of State
 2009 – Luis Fortuño elected as Governor of Puerto Rico

 2010s
 2010 – Abel Maldonado appointed lieutenant governor of California
 2011 – Marco Rubio elected as United States senator from Florida
 Quico Canseco (TX), Bill Flores (TX), Jaime Herrera Beutler (WA), Raúl Labrador (ID) and David Rivera (FL) elected to U.S. Congress
 Susana Martinez elected as Governor of New Mexico and Brian Sandoval elected as Governor of Nevada
 John Sanchez elected as lieutenant governor of New Mexico
 2013 – Ted Cruz elected as United States senator from Texas
 Ron DeSantis (FL) elected to U.S. Congress
 Sean Reyes appointed Utah Attorney General
 2014 – Carlos López–Cantera appointed as lieutenant governor of Florida
 Carlos Curbelo (FL) & Alex Mooney (WV) elected to U.S. Congress
 Evelyn Sanguinetti elected as lieutenant governor of Illinois
 George P. Bush elected as Texas commissioner of the General Land Office
 2015 – Carlos Cascos appointed as Texas Secretary of State
 Joe Baca, former Democratic U.S. representative for California joins GOP
 2016 – Jenniffer González elected as resident commissioner of Puerto Rico and Brian Mast (FL) elected to U.S. Congress
 2017 – President Donald Trump appoints the following:
 Alexander Acosta as United States Secretary of Labor
 Helen Aguirre Ferré as White House Director of Media Affairs
 Jovita Carranza as Treasurer of the United States
 Anna Maria Farias as Assistant Secretary of Housing and Urban Development for Fair Housing and Equal Opportunity
 Douglas Domenech as Assistant United States Secretary of the Interior for Insular Affairs
 Mercedes Schlapp as White House Director of Strategic Communications
 José A. Viana as Director of the Office of English Language Acquisition
 Carlos Trujillo as United States Ambassador to the Organization of American States
 Chris Garcia as Director of the Minority Business Development Agency
 Jennifer S. Korn as Deputy Director of the Office of Public Liaison 
 Brian Quintenz as Member of the Commodity Futures Trading Commission
 Rolando Pablos appointed as Texas Secretary of State
 Dave Lopez appointed as Secretary of State of Oklahoma
 2018 – President Donald Trump appoints the following:
 Edward C. Prado – United States Ambassador to Argentina 
 Raymond P. Martinez as Administrator of the Federal Motor Carrier Safety Administration
 James E Campos as Director of the Office of Minority Economic Impact
 Anthony Gonzalez (OH) elected to U.S. Congress
 2019 – Jeanette Nuñez elected as lieutenant governor of Florida
 Ruth R. Hughs appointed as Texas Secretary of State
 Lea Márquez Peterson appointed as a member of the Arizona Corporation Commission
 2020 – Mike Garcia (CA), Carlos A. Giménez (FL), Tony Gonzales (TX), Nicole Malliotakis (NY), and Maria Elvira Salazar (FL) are elected to U.S. Congress
 2021 – Jason Miyares elected as Attorney General of Virginia
 2022 – Mayra Flores (TX), Lori Chavez-DeRemer (OR), Juan Ciscomani (AZ), Anthony D'Esposito (NY), Monica De La Cruz (TX), Anna Paulina Luna (FL), George Santos (NY) and James Moylan (GU) are elected to U.S. Congress
 Raúl Labrador elected as Attorney General of Idaho
 Diego Morales elected as Secretary of State of Indiana
 Manny Díaz Jr. appointed as Education Commissioner of Florida

Politicians

Alaska
Liz Vazquez – Alaska State representative (2015–2017)

Arizona
Steve Montenegro – Arizona State representative (2009–2017, 2023-present) and Arizona State senator (2017)
T. J. Shope – Arizona State representative (2013–2021) & Arizona State senator (2021–present)
Tony Rivero – Arizona State representative (2015–present)
Ben Toma – Arizona State representative (2015–present)
Leo Biasiucci – Arizona State representative (2019–present)
Lupe Diaz – Arizona State representative (2021–present)
Teresa Martinez – Arizona State representative (2021–present)
Michele Pena - Arizona State representative (2023-present)

Arkansas
Justin Gonzales – Arkansas State representative (2015–present)
Jim Sorvillo – Arkansas State representative (2015–present)

California
Rod Pacheco – California State Assemblyman (1996–2002) and Riverside County District Attorney (2007–2011)
Bob Pacheco – California State Assemblyman (1998–2004)
Charlene Zettel – California State Assemblywoman (1998–2002)
Bonnie Garcia – California State Assemblywoman (2002–2008)
Rocky Chavez – California State Assemblyman (2012–2018)
Eric Linder – California State Assemblyman (2012–2016)
Melissa Melendez – California State Assemblywoman (2012–2020) and California State senator (2020–2022)
Heath Flora – California State Assemblyman (2016–present)
Dante Acosta – California State Assemblyman (2016–2018)
Rosilicie Ochoa Bogh – California State senator (2020–present)
Suzette Martinez Valladares – California State Assemblywoman (2020–2022)
Kate Sanchez – California State Assemblywoman (2022–present)
Juan Alanis - California State Assemblyman (2022-present)
Josh Hoover - California State Assemblyman (2022-present)

Colorado
Andres Pico – Colorado State representative (2021–2023)
Dave Williams – Colorado State representative (2017–2023)
Philip Covarrubias – Colorado State representative (2017–2019)
Beth Martinez Humenik – Colorado State senator (2015–2019)
Clarice Navarro – Colorado State representative (2013–2017)
George Rivera – Colorado State senator (2013–2015)
Robert Ramirez – Colorado State representative (2011–2013)
Stella Garza–Hicks – Colorado State representative (2007–2009)
Lionel Rivera – mayors of Colorado Springs (2003–2011)

Connecticut
 Aundre Bumgardner – Connecticut State representative (2015–2017)
 Art Linares – Connecticut State senator (2013–2019)

Delaware
Ernesto Lopez – Delaware senator (2012–present)
Joseph Miró – Delaware State representative (1998–2018)

Florida
Humberto Cortina – Florida State representative (1982–1984)
Roberto Casas – Florida State representative (1982–1988) and Florida State senator (1988–2000)
Javier Souto – Florida State senator (1984–1992)
Luis C. Morse – Florida State representative (1984–1998)
Alberto Gutman – Florida State representative (1984–1992) and Florida State senator (1992–1998)
Arnhilda Gonzalez–Quevedo – Florida State representative (1984–1988)
Luis E. Rojas – Florida State representative (1988–1998)
Carlos L. Valdes – Florida State representative (1988–2000)
Nilo Juri – Florida State representative (1988–1993)
Miguel De Grandy – Florida State representative (1989–1994)
Carlos A. Manrique – Florida State representative (1992–1994)
Eladio Armesto–Garcia – Florida State representative (1992–1994)
Bruno Barreiro – Florida State representative (1992–1998)
Carlos A. Lacasa – Florida State representative (1994–2002)
Gustavo Barreiro – Florida State representative (1996–2008)
Gaston Cantens – Florida State representative (1996–2004)
Manuel Prieguez – Florida State representative (1998–2004)
Al Cardenas – chairman of the Republican Party of Florida (1999–2003)
Ralph Arza – Florida State representative (2000–2006)
Alex Diaz de la Portilla – Florida State senator (2000–2010)
Rene Garcia – Florida State representative (2000–2010) and Florida State senator (2010–2018)
Rudy Garcia – Florida State senator (2000–2010)
Joe Negron – Florida State representative (2000–2006) and Florida State senator (2009–2018)
J. Alex Villalobos – Florida State senator (2001–2010)
Carl J. Domino – Florida State representative (2002–2010) and U.S. House nominee (2014)
Marcelo Llorente – Florida State representative (2002–2010)
Juan–Carlos Planas – Florida State representative (2002–2010)
John Quiñones – Florida State representative (2002–2007) and U.S. House Candidate (2012)
Juan C. Zapata – Florida State representative (2002–2010)
Anitere Flores – Florida State representative (2004–2010) and Florida State senator (2010–2018)
Julio Robaina – mayor of Hialeah (2005–2011)
Eduardo González – Florida State representative (2006–2014)
Esteban Bovo – Florida State representative (2008–2010) 
Erik Fresen – Florida State representative (2008–2016)
Tomás Regalado – mayor of Miami (2009–2017)
Fred Costello – Florida State representative (2010–2012 & 2014–2016) and U.S. House Candidate (2012)
Frank Artiles – Florida State representative (2010–2016) & Florida State senator (2016–2017)
Miguel Diaz de la Portilla – Florida State senator (2010–2016)
Jose Felix Diaz – Florida State representative (2010–2017)
Jeanette Núñez – Florida State representative (2010–2018)
Ana Rivas Logan – Florida State representative (2010–2012)
Carlos Trujillo – Florida State representative (2010–2018)
Jose R. Oliva – Florida State representative (2011–2020)
Carlos Hernandez – mayor of Hialeah, Florida (2011–present)
Mike La Rosa – Florida State representative (2012–2020)
Manny Díaz, Jr. – Florida State representative (2012–2018) & Florida State senator (2018–2022)
Ray Rodrigues – Florida State representative (2012–2020) & Florida State senator (2020–present)
David Santiago – Florida State representative (2012–2020)
Bob Cortes – Florida State representative (2014–2018)
Rene Plasencia – Florida State representative (2014–2022)
Julio Gonzalez – Florida State representative (2014–2018)
Bryan Avila – Florida State representative (2014–2022) & Florida State senator (2022–present)
Jackie Toledo – Florida State representative (2016–2022)
Daniel Anthony Perez – Florida State representative (2017–present)
Francis X. Suarez – mayor of Miami (2017–present)
Ana Maria Rodriguez – Florida State representative (2018–2020) & Florida State senator (2020–present)
Anthony Rodriguez – Florida State representative (2018–2022)
Juan Fernandez–Barquin – Florida State representative (2018–present)
Ileana Garcia – Florida State senator (2020–present)
David Borrero – Florida State representative (2020–present)
Adam Botana – Florida State representative (2020–present)
Demi Busatta Cabrera – Florida State representative (2020–present)
Alex Rizo – Florida State representative (2020–present)
Alexis Calatayud – Florida State senator (2022-present)
Carolina Amesty – Florida State representative (2022–present)
Karen Gonzalez Pittman – Florida State representative (2022–present)
Danny Alvarez – Florida State representative (2022–present)
Tiffany Esposito – Florida State representative (2022–present)
Fabián Basabe – Florida State representative (2022–present)
Vicki Lopez – Florida State representative (2022–present)
Alina Garcia – Florida State representative (2022–present)
Juan Carlos Porras – Florida State representative (2022–present)
Susan Plasencia – Florida State representative (2022–present)

Georgia
Rey Martinez – Georgia State representative (2023–present)
Jason Anavitarte – Georgia State senator (2021–present)
Steven Sainz – Georgia State representative (2019–present)
David Casas – Georgia State representative (2003–2019)

Hawaii
Joseph R. Garcia, Jr. – Hawaii State representative (1959–1974)
Diamond Garcia - Hawaii State representative (2023-present)

Illinois
Frank Aguilar – Illinois State representative (2002–2004)
John Cabello – Illinois State representative (2013–2021)

Indiana
Rebecca Kubacki – Indiana State representative (2010–2014)

Iowa
Mark Costello – Iowa State representative (2012–present)
Mark Cisneros – Iowa State representative (2021–present)

Kansas
Ramon Gonzalez Jr. – Kansas State representative (2011–2017)
Mario Goico – Kansas State representative (2003–2017)
Carlos Mayans – mayor of Wichita, Kansas (2003–2007)

Kentucky
Ralph Alvarado – Kentucky State senator (2015–2023)

Louisiana
Blake Miguez – Louisiana State representative (2015–present)

Maryland
Rachel Muñoz – Maryland State Delegate (2021–present)
Jesse Pippy – Maryland State Delegate (2019–present)
Pedro del Valle - Candidate for the Republication nomination for governor of Maryland (1954)

Michigan
Angela Rigas – Michigan State representative (2023–present)
Shane Hernandez – Michigan State representative (2017–2021)
Daniela Garcia – Michigan State representative (2015–2019)

Minnesota
Eric Lucero – Minnesota State representative (2015–present)
Jon Koznick – Minnesota State representative (2015–present)

Mississippi
Shane Aguirre – Mississippi State representative (2016–present)

Missouri
Robert Cornejo – Missouri State representative (2013–present)

Nebraska
Ray Aguilar – Member of the Nebraska Legislature (2021–present & 1999–2008)

Nevada
Victoria Seaman – Nevada State Assemblywoman (2015–2017) & Las Vegas City Councillor (2019–present)

New Hampshire
Marilinda Garcia – New Hampshire State representative (2006–2014) & U.S. House nominee (2014)
Carlos Gonzalez – New Hampshire State representative (2010–2012 & 2014–2016)
Bianca Garcia – New Hampshire State representative (2012–2014)
Eric Estevez – New Hampshire State representative (2014–2016)
Steve Negron – New Hampshire State representative (2016–2018) & U.S. House nominee (2018)
Hershel Nunez – New Hampshire State representative (2019–present)
Jose Cambrils – New Hampshire State representative (2021–present)
Matthew Santonastaso – New Hampshire State representative (2021–present)

New Jersey
José F. Sosa – New Jersey Assemblyman (1992–1994)
Eric Munoz – New Jersey Assemblyman (2001–2009)
Maria Rodriguez-Gregg – New Jersey Assemblywoman (2014–2018)
Christian Barranco – New Jersey Assemblywoman (2022–present)

New Mexico
Larry Larrañaga – New Mexico State representative (1995–2018)
Nora Espinoza – New Mexico State representative (2007–2017)
Alonzo Baldonado – New Mexico State representative (2011–2022)
David Chavez – New Mexico State representative (2011–2013)
Kelly Fajardo – New Mexico State representative (2013–2023)
David Gallegos – New Mexico State senator (2021–present) & New Mexico State representative (2013–2021)
Paul Pacheco – New Mexico State representative (2013–2017)
Vickie Perea – New Mexico State representative (2013–2015)
Monica Youngblood – New Mexico State representative (2013–2019)
Lisa Torraco – New Mexico State senator (2013–2017)
Sarah Maestas Barnes – New Mexico State representative (2015–2019)
Rod Montoya – New Mexico State representative (2015–present)
Andy Nuñez – New Mexico State representative (2015–2017)
Ted Barela – New Mexico State senator (2015–2017)
Gregory Baca – New Mexico State senator (2017–present)
Martin R. Zamora – New Mexico State representative (2019–present)
Joshua Hernandez – New Mexico State representative (2021–present)
Joshua A. Sanchez – New Mexico State senator (2021–present)
Luis Terrazas – New Mexico State representative (2021–present)
Brian Baca – New Mexico State representative (2022–present)
Tanya Mirabal Moya – New Mexico State representative (2023–present)
Alan Martinez – New Mexico State representative (2023–present)

New York
Nicole Malliotakis – New York State representative (2011–2021)
Pete Lopez – New York State representative (2007–2017)
Michael J. Garcia – United States Attorney for the Southern District of New York (2005–2008) & Associate judge of the New York Court of Appeals (2016–present)

Ohio
Rick Perales – Ohio State representative (2013–2021)
George Lang – Ohio State senator (2021–present) & Ohio State representative (2017–2021)
Alessandro Cutrona – Ohio State representative (2021–present)

Oklahoma
Jessica Garvin – Oklahoma State senator (2021–present)
Ryan Martinez – Oklahoma State representative (2016–present)
Charles Ortega – Oklahoma State representative (2008–present)

Oregon
Tracy Cramer – Oregon State representative (2023-present)
Sal Esquivel – Oregon State representative (2005–2019)
Linda Flores – Oregon State representative (2003–2009)

Rhode Island
 Thomas Paolino – Rhode Island State senator (2017–present)
 Jessica de la Cruz – Rhode Island State senator (2019–present)

Tennessee
Dolores Gresham – Tennessee State senator (2008–2020)

Texas
Victor G. Carrillo – Texas Railroad commissioner (2002–2011)
Aaron Peña – Texas State representative (2003–2013)
Ryan Guillen – Texas State representative (2003–present)
Orlando Sanchez – Harris County Treasurer (2005–2019)
J. M. Lozano – Texas State representative (2009–present)
Larry Gonzalez – Texas State representative (2011–2019)
Jose Aliseda – Texas State representative (2011–2013)
John Garza – Texas State representative (2011–2013)
Raul Torres – Texas State representative (2011–2013)
Buddy Garcia – Texas Railroad commissioner (2012–2012)
Jason Villalba – Texas State representative (2013–2019)
Rick Galindo – Texas State representative (2015–2017)
Gilbert Peña – Texas State representative (2015–2017)
John Lujan – Texas State representative (2021–present & 2016–2017)
Pete Flores – Texas State senator (2023–present & 2018–2021)
Janie Lopez – Texas State representative (2023–present)
Kronda Thimesch – Texas State representative (2023–present)
Mano DeAyala – Texas State representative (2023–present)

Utah
Timothy Adrian Jimenez – Utah State representative (2023–present)

Virginia
Jeff Frederick – chairman of the Republican Party of Virginia (2010–2013) and Virginia State delegate (2004–2010)

Washington
Alex Ybarra – Washington State representative (2019–present)
Nikki Torres – Washington State senator (2023-present)

West Virginia
Elias Coop-Gonzalez – West Virginia State delegate (2023–present)
Patricia Rucker – West Virginia State senator (2017–present)
Paul Espinosa – West Virginia State delegate (2013–present)

Wisconsin
Jessie Rodriguez – Wisconsin State assemblywoman (2013–present)
Rachael Cabral–Guevara – Wisconsin State assemblywoman (2021–2023) & Wisconsin State senator (2023–present)

Wyoming
Tim Salazar – Wyoming State representative (2017–2021) & Wyoming State senator (2021–present)
Rachel Rodriguez-Williams – Wyoming State representative (2021–present)
John Romero-Martinez – Wyoming State representative (2021–2023)
Tamara Trujillo – Wyoming State representative (2023–present)

Judges
Roger Benitez – judge of the United States District Court for the Southern District of California (2004–2017)
Eva Guzman – Texas Supreme Court justice (2009–2021)
Dora Irizarry – judge of the United States District Court for the Eastern District of New York (2003–2020)
David M. Medina – Texas Supreme Court justice (2004–2012)
Marilyn Milian – State Circuit Court judge and current judge on The People's Court
Xavier Rodriguez – judge of the United States District Court for the Western District of Texas (2003–present) & Texas Supreme Court justice (2001–2003)
Faustino J. Fernandez–Vina – justice of the New Jersey Supreme Court (2013–present)
Barbara Lagoa – judge of the United States Court of Appeals for the Eleventh Circuit (2019–present) & justice of the Supreme Court of Florida (2019)
Carlos G. Muñiz – justice of the Supreme Court of Florida (2019–present)

Athletes and entertainers
María Conchita Alonso – Singer/actress
Desi Arnaz – musician, band leader, actor, producer
Rachel Campos–Duffy – Actress
Leo Carrillo – Actor
Verónica Castro – Singer
Erik Estrada – Actor
Andy García – Actor
Jorge Masvidal – Mixed Martial Artist
Ricardo Montalbán – Actor
Freddie Prinze, Jr. – Actor
Lil Pump – Rapper
Paul Rodriguez (actor)
Cesar Romero – Actor (1907–1994).
Jeanette Dousdebes Rubio – Former member Miami Dolphins Cheerleaders
Jon Secada – Singer
Jaci Velasquez – Singer
Eduardo Verástegui – Model/Actor
Raquel Welch – Actress
Sofia Vergara - Actress

Law
Miguel Estrada – Attorney
Michael J. Garcia – U.S. Attorney for the Southern District of New York

Science
    Luis Walter Alvarez – Nobel Prize winning physicist, inventor and professor
Dr. Tirso del Junco – diplomate of the American Board of Surgery and Fellow of the American College of Surgeons

Columnists, authors and journalists 
Jason Mattera – Author of Obama Zombies: How the Liberal Machine Brainwashed My Generation
Alex Castellanos – Political Media Consultant
Linda Chavez – Political pundant, author
Geraldo Rivera – Author, attorney, political commentator, former talk show host, journalist
Leslie Sanchez – Political pundant

Education and Business
Claudia Bermúdez – Businesswoman and U.S. House Candidate (2008)
Ben Fernandez – Financial Consultant
Jeff Giesea – Businessman and organizer of alt–right and pro–Donald Trump activities. His mother is Mexican–American.
Armando Gutierrez – Entrepreneur
Robert Oscar Lopez – College professor, Author
Alfonso Martinez–Fonts Jr. – Businessman, Assistant Secretary for the Private Sector of the Department of Homeland Security
Felix Sabates – Entrepreneur
Andy Unanue – Businessman
Raul Danny Vargas – Businessman, Media Commentator, Political Activist
Jorge Mas – Businessman, Activist
Lourdes Portela Gimenez – former Personnel and Technology Operations Administrative Director Office Miami–Dade County Public School System

Activists
Bernard Barker – Cuban–American, anti–Castro activist, worked for the Committee to Re–Elect the President and fundraiser for the Nixon campaign
Carlos Bonilla - Lobbyist and adviser to President George W. Bush, senior fellow at the Heritage Foundation
Orlando Bosch – Anti–Castro activist
Al Cardenas – Former chairman of the American Conservative Union
Rafael Cruz – Protestant clergyman, active in campaigns of his son, U.S. senator Ted Cruz 
Pedro del Valle – Retired Lieutenant General, U.S. Marine Corps, founder Defenders of the American Constitution
Tito the Builder – Activist
Miguel A. García Méndez – Activist
Virgilio Gonzalez – Activist, Watergate burglar
Marco Gutierrez – Activist, co–founder Latinos for Trump
Gaspar Jimenez – Anti–Castro activist
Eugenio R. Martinez – Anti–Castro activist, Watergate burglar
Mauro E. Mujica – Chilean American, chairman and CEO of U.S. English
Jorge Mas Canosa – Businessman, anti–Castro activist, founder of Cuban American National Foundation
Luis Posada Carriles – Anti–Castro activist
Enrique Tarrio – Henry "Enrique" Tarrio, activist and chairman of the Proud Boys
Enrique Ros – Anti–Castro activist
Larry Rubin – Mexican American, President and chairman of The American Society of Mexico, and chairman of Republicans Abroad for Mexico

See also

Hispanic and Latino Americans in politics
Latino vote
Congressional Hispanic Conference
List of Latin Americans
List of Latino Republicans
Republican National Hispanic Assembly
Black conservatism in the United States
Asian American and Pacific Islands American conservatism in the United States
List of minority governors and lieutenant governors in the United States
Conservative Democrat

Further reading

 Cadava, Geraldo. (2020). The Hispanic Republican: The Shaping of an American Political Identity, from Nixon to Trump. Ecco Press. 
 Flavio R Hickel, Jr., Rudy Alamillo, Kassra A R Oskooii, Loren Collingwood. (2021). "The Role of Identity Prioritization: Why Some Latinx Support Restrictionist Immigration Policies and Candidates." Public Opinion Quarterly.
 Jacoby, Tamar. (2012). "How Romney could win over Latinos." Los Angeles Times.

References

 
 
 
 
Conservatism-related lists
 
Hispanic
 
 
Conservatism in the United States